Half Nelson is a short-lived American detective comedy-drama series starring Joe Pesci that aired on NBC from March 24 until May 10, 1985. The pilot episode starred Hollywood actor Rod Taylor.

Premise
Rocky Nelson is a former New York City cop who moved to Beverly Hills, where he got a job at a private security service for the rich and famous, while attempting to make it as an actor. In addition to guarding celebrities, he also helps solve crimes.

Cast
Joe Pesci as Rocky Nelson
Fred Williamson as Chester Long
Victoria Jackson as Annie O'Hara
Bubba Smith as Kurt
Dick Butkus as Beau
Gary Grubbs as Det. Hamill
Dean Martin as Himself

Episodes

References

External links 
 

1985 American television series debuts
1985 American television series endings
NBC original programming
1980s American comedy-drama television series
Television shows set in Los Angeles
American detective television series
Television series by 20th Century Fox Television